Events from the year 1959 in Ireland.

Incumbents
 President:
 Seán T. O'Kelly (until 24 June 1959)
 Éamon de Valera (from 25 June 1959)
 Taoiseach:
 Éamon de Valera (FF) (until 23 June 1959)
 Seán Lemass (FF) (from 23 June 1959)
 Tánaiste:
Seán Lemass (FF) (until 23 June 1959)
Seán MacEntee (FF) (from 23 June 1959)
 Minister for Finance: James Ryan (FF)
 Chief Justice: Conor Maguire
 Dáil: 16th
 Seanad: 9th

Events
7 January – Dáil Éireann debated a motion that Éamon de Valera's position as controlling director of the Irish Press could be regarded as incompatible with his duties as Taoiseach.
23 January – The government was considering the introduction of a pay-as-you-earn system of income tax.
10 February – Unions voted to end the 15-year split in the Irish trade union movement. The Irish Congress of Trade Unions resulted from the merger of the TUC and the CIU.
8 April – James Dillon of the Fine Gael party wanted to abolish compulsory Irish at school as he felt it was counter-productive.
25 June – Éamon de Valera was inaugurated at Dublin Castle as the third President of Ireland.
9 July – The first twelve female recruits were selected to join the Garda Síochána.
29 July – The new Department of Transport and Power was established. Erskine Childers was the first Minister, and Thekla Beere was departmental Secretary, the first woman to achieve this grade in the Irish Civil Service.
22 September – At its inaugural conference the Irish Congress of Trade Unions attacked the government of Northern Ireland for not recognising the new organisation.
4 October – Three men collapsed and died at Croke Park during the All-Ireland Hurling Final Replay.
21 October – James Dillon was elected leader of the Fine Gael Party.  He replaced Richard Mulcahy as leader and John A. Costello as parliamentary leader.
Figures released on 4 February 1960 showed that 118 million telephone calls were made in 1959.

Arts and literature
 2 February – John B. Keane's play Sive was premiered at Walsh's Ballroom, Listowel, by an amateur group.
 12 February – The first edition of the Irish Music Charts Top 10 was printed in the Evening Herald newspaper. Elvis Presley's "One Night" became the first song to top the charts. (The official charts were founded by RTÉ in 1962.)
 3 March – The film Home Is the Hero, based on the play by and starring Walter Macken, was released in Dublin.
 24 June – Walt Disney's film Darby O'Gill and the Little People, based on H. T. Kavanagh's short stories, had its world premiere in Dublin.
 15 September – Donagh MacDonagh's play Lady Spider, a retelling of the Deirdre myth, premiered at the Gas Company Theatre, Dún Laoghaire.
 28 September – Dominic Behan's play Posterity Be Damned premiered at the Gaiety Theatre, Dublin.
 30 September – The film of Mise Éire, made by George Morrison with music by Seán Ó Riada for Gael Linn, premiered to conclude the Cork Film Festival, the first feature-length Irish language film.
 December – British-Irish actor Peter O'Toole married Welsh actress Siân Phillips in Dublin.

Sports

Association football
St Patrick's Athletic won the FAI Cup
Shamrock Rovers won the League of Ireland

Hurling
Waterford GAA won the All-Ireland Senior Hurling Championship

Births
6 January – Davy Spillane, folk rock musician, uillean piper.
6 February – Dermot Bolger, novelist, playwright and poet.
20 February – Patrick Walker, soccer player and manager.
22 February – Matthew Dwyer, cricketer.
21 May
Fergus Johnston, composer.
Brian Lenihan, Fianna Fáil TD for Dublin West and Minister for Finance (died 2011).
13 June – Mairead McGuinness, journalist, Member of the European Parliament.
13 June – Mary Wallace, Fianna Fáil TD for Meath East and Minister of State at the Department of Agriculture and Food.
4 August – John Gormley, leader of the Green Party, Minister for the Environment, Heritage and Local Government and TD for Dublin South-East.
9 August – Hugh Brady, President of University College Dublin.
28 August – Lorcan Cranitch, actor.
28 September – Michael Scott, genre fiction author.
1 October – Billy Timmins, Fine Gael TD.
8 October – Gavin Friday, singer, songwriter, composer and painter.
20 October – Niamh Cusack, actress.
7 November – John Anderson, soccer player.
28 November – Stephen Roche, road racing cyclist, in 1987 won Tour de France, the Giro d'Italia and the World Cycling Championship.
4 December – Paul McGrath, Irish international soccer player.
Full date unknown – Lorcan O'Herlihy, architect and artist in the United States.

Deaths
9 January – A. M. Sullivan, lawyer (born 1871).
January – Patrick O'Connell, soccer player and manager (born 1887).
4 February – Una O'Connor, actress (born 1880).
7 March – T. C. Murray, dramatist (born 1873).
13 March – Robert Forde, Antarctic explorer (born 1875).
16 March – Dick Doyle, Kilkenny hurler (born 1884).
21 April – Sep Lambert, cricketer (born 1876).
15 May – Liam de Róiste, company director, member 1st Dáil (Pro Treaty), representing Cork City.
16 May – Elisha Scott, footballer (born 1894).
13 June – Seán Lester, diplomat and last Secretary General of the League of Nations (born 1888).
25 June – Mick Kenny, Galway hurler (born 1893).
21 August – Denis Devlin, poet and diplomat (born 1908 in Scotland).

References

 
1950s in Ireland
Ireland
Years of the 20th century in Ireland